Abdelraouf Benguit (born 5 April 1996 in Laghouat) is an Algerian footballer who plays for Raja CA.

Club career
A product of the Paradou AC youth academy, Benguit made his professional debut for the club on 14 August 2015, as a starter in the opening match of the 2015–16 Algerian Ligue Professionnelle 2 season against USM Bel-Abbès.

USM Alger

Espérance de Tunis
On 2 July 2019 Raouf Benguit joined Espérance de Tunis for four seasons coming from Paradou AC for 742,000 US$. He made his debut for Espérance in the Ligue 1 during a win against US Tataouine, later in the Champions League Benguit scored the winning goal against Elect-Sport his first goal with the club. On 15 March 2020 Benguit scored his first brace in Tunisian Cup against AS Marsa. In his first season, he won two titles, the Ligue Professionnelle 1 and the Super Cup And the most player who played matches this season with 42 and scored 7 goals.

MC Alger
In 2022, he joined MC Alger.

International career
In November 2015 Benguit was selected as part of Algeria's squad for the 2015 Africa U-23 Cup of Nations in Senegal.

On 1 June 2017 Benguit was called up to the Algeria national football team for the first time for a friendly match against Guinea and a 2019 Africa Cup of Nations qualifier against Togo.

Career statistics

Club

Honours

Club
 USM Alger
 Algerian Ligue Professionnelle 1 (1): 2018–19
 Algerian Super Cup (1): 2016

 Espérance de Tunis
 Tunisian Ligue Professionnelle 1 (2): 2019–20, 2020–21
 Tunisian Super Cup (1): 2020

References

External links
 
 

1996 births
2015 Africa U-23 Cup of Nations players
Algeria under-23 international footballers
Algerian footballers
Algerian Ligue 2 players
Living people
Paradou AC players
People from Laghouat
Raja CA players
USM Alger players
Espérance Sportive de Tunis players
Footballers at the 2016 Summer Olympics
Olympic footballers of Algeria
Association football fullbacks
Association football midfielders
Algerian Ligue Professionnelle 1 players
Algeria A' international footballers
Algeria international footballers
21st-century Algerian people